Nylund is a neighborhood (delområde) in the city of Stavanger which lies in the southwestern part of the large municipality of Stavanger in Rogaland county, Norway. It is located in the borough of Storhaug, between the neighborhoods of Johannes and Paradis.

References

Boroughs and neighbourhoods of Stavanger